Major Henry Wilfred Persse MC (19 September 1885 – 28 June 1918) was an English first-class cricketer. Persse was a right-handed batsman who bowled right-arm fast.

Persse made his first-class debut for Hampshire County Cricket Club in the 1905 County Championship against Surrey.

Persse represented Hampshire in 51 first-class matches from 1905 to 1909, with his final appearance for the county coming in the 1909 County Championship against Kent at the St Lawrence Ground, Canterbury. In his 51 matches for the county, Persse scored 889 runs at a batting average of 11.69, with three half centuries and a high score of 71 against Derbyshire in 1907. Persse played as an all rounder, taking 127 wickets at a bowling average of 30.02, with 3 five wicket hauls and best bowling figures of 6/64 against Leicestershire in 1907. The 1907 season was Persse's best with the ball, during which he took 60 wickets at an average of 23.20, with two five wicket hauls.

Persse's first-class career finished, with the reason given being he was travelling abroad. Persse served in the First World War with the Royal Fusiliers, where he attained the rank of Major. At some point in the war Persse was awarded the Military Cross, having a bar added to it sometime afterward. Persse was wounded twice during the war and it was of wounds that he would die near St Omer, France on 28 June 1918.

References

External links
Henry Persse at Cricinfo
Henry Persse at CricketArchive
Matches and detailed statistics for Henry Persse

1885 births
1918 deaths
Cricketers from Southampton
English cricketers
Hampshire cricketers
British Army personnel of World War I
British military personnel killed in World War I
Royal Fusiliers officers
Recipients of the Military Cross